Kharchenko is a Ukrainian-language surname. The surname may refer to:
  (1927–1985), Soviet painter

 Yekaterina Kharchenko (born 1977), Russian politician
 Ihor Kharchenko (born 1962), Ukrainian diplomat
 Ivan Kharchenko (1918–1989), Soviet Army engineering colonel
 Nadezhda Kharchenko (born 1987), Russian footballer
 Petro Kharchenko (born 1983), Ukrainian pair skater
 Vadim Kharchenko (born 1984), Kyrgyzstani footballer
 Vadym Kharchenko (born 1975), Ukrainian footballer
 Valentina Kharchenko (born 1949), Russian track and field athlete
 Yuri Kharchenko (born 1963), Soviet luger
 Yury Kharchenko (born 1986), German artist

See also
 

Ukrainian-language surnames
Surnames of Ukrainian origin